Sui generis is a status that defies categorization

Sui Generis may also refer to:
 Sui Generis, an Argentinian folk rock band
 Sui Generis (album), a 1989 recording by Yuri